Jahanabad-e Bala may refer to:
 Jahanabad-e Bala, Golestan
 Jahanabad-e Bala, Kerman
 Jahanabad-e Bala, Kohgiluyeh and Boyer-Ahmad
 Jahanabad-e Bala, Sistan and Baluchestan
 Jahanabad-e Bala, Tehran

See also
 Jahanabad-e Olya (disambiguation)